Lebohang Mokoena (born 29 September 1986 in Soweto, Gauteng) is a South African footballer who plays for Moroka Swallows.

Mokoena is known for his pace and dribbling ability, and is most commonly found playing upfront or on the right wing. He has no relation with former Portsmouth FC player Aaron Mokoena. He is also extremely famous for being featured on Football Manager 2005 as a high potential and relatively cheap signing.

Early beginnings
Mokoena started playing football at the age of eight, playing football in the streets of his birthplace, Diepkloof in Soweto.

While growing up, Mokoena excelled in other sports athletics. He had a keen interest in sprinting and broke records in the 100, 200 and 800 meter events at his Primary school. Mokoena began playing football for his local team Diepkloof Hellenic.

Career
Mokoena's arrival into the professional ranks was promoted to the first team at the age of seventeen. He made his PSL debut coming on as a substitute in the 2–2 draw away to Santos on 1 November 2003, going on to play twenty-four matches in that season, starting eleven and coming off the bench thirteen times; he netted five goals.

In the next season (2004–05), his efforts were rewarded when he won the club's Most Improved Player of the Year award.

In 2006 Lebohang was promoted to Orlando Pirates senior team where he spent three seasons, before moving to Pretoria side Mamelodi Sundowns. Mokoena currently plays for Moroka Swallows F.C. and he is also their captain.

National career
Mokoena is one of a few young players in the country who has the record of having represented his nation at all levels starting with the Under-17 (14 caps), U-20 (2 caps) and he was a regular figure, and one of the top goal scorers, in the U-23 squad.

"Cheeseboy", as he is nicknamed, made his international debut in a 2–1 win against Mexico during the CONCACAF Gold Cup in the United States on 8 July 2005.

References
 
 

1986 births
Living people
Sportspeople from Soweto
South African Sotho people
South African soccer players
South Africa international soccer players
2005 CONCACAF Gold Cup players
2006 Africa Cup of Nations players
Association football midfielders
Association football forwards
Orlando Pirates F.C. players
Mamelodi Sundowns F.C. players
Cape Town Spurs F.C. players
Moroka Swallows F.C. players
South African Premier Division players
National First Division players